This is the progression of world record improvements of the long jump W60 division of Masters athletics.

Key

References

Masters Athletics Long Jump list

Masters athletics world record progressions
Long